John Edwin Diedrich (born 25 February 1953 in Melbourne, Victoria) is an Australian actor, director, producer and singer, known for stage and television roles in Australia and the UK.

He played the lead role of Curly in the 1980 West End revival of Oklahoma! (for which he was nominated for an Olivier Award for Best Actor in a Musical), and also in the 1982 Australian tour.

He directed, produced and starred in the Australian production of the musical Nine in 1987. He directed and produced the Theatre Royal, Sydney season of the musical Titanic in 2006.

Notable television roles include in Bluey, Special Squad and The Challenge in Australia, and The Gingerbread Girl in the UK.

References

External links

1953 births
Living people
Australian male stage actors
Australian male television actors
Australian theatre managers and producers
Australian theatre directors
Australian male musical theatre actors
Australian male singers